State Route 179, also known as SR 179, the Red Rock Scenic Byway, a north–south state highway in Arizona, United States, running from Interstate 17 to SR 89A in Sedona, entering Coconino County from Yavapai County.  In 2006, the US Dept. of Transportation awarded SR 179 its highest designation within the National Scenic Byways Program: the All-American Road designation, due to the red rock and sandstone formations through which it travels along its  length within the hills of the Coconino National Forest.  The All-American Road designation also signifies to the travelling public that this is a road that is "a destination unto itself".

Route description

SR 179 heads northwest from the interchange briefly before curving towards the north. It keeps this heading as it passes through the red rock area of the Village of Oak Creek on its way to Sedona, just a few miles north. As it enters the Sedona city limits, it roughly follows along the east bank of Oak Creek. It crosses the creek just before reaching its northern terminus at SR 89A.

History
The original SR 179 was designated between 1935 and 1939 from SR 79 (now SR 89A) to SR 69 in Prescott Valley. By 1960, this route was cancelled, and SR 179 was designated on its current route.

Junction list

References

External links

 Official website of the Red Rock Scenic Byway
 Red Rock Scenic Byway on Arizona's Scenic Roads
 Red Rock Scenic Byways section on the National Scenic Byways website

179
Transportation in Yavapai County, Arizona
Transportation in Coconino County, Arizona
Scenic highways in Arizona
Sedona, Arizona